Vadodara district also known as Baroda district is a district in the eastern part of the state of Gujarat in western India. The city of Vadodara (Baroda), in the western part of the district, is the administrative headquarters. Vadodara District covers an area of 7,794 km2. As of 2011, the district had a population of 4,165,626 of which 49.6% were urban, 50.4% were rural, 5.3% were Scheduled castes and 27.6% were Scheduled tribes. As of 2011 it is the third most populous district of Gujarat (out of 33

Climate

The Vadodara district has a dry climate and three distinct seasons, namely summer, winter and monsoon.

Divisions

Vadodara is divided into 2 Prants:
 Vadodara
 Dabhoi

Vadodara is divided into 8 talukas:

 Dabhoi
 Karjan
 Padra
 Savli
 Sinor
 Vadodara City
 Vadodara Rural
 Waghodia

Demographics

Its population growth rate over the decade 2001-2011 was  14.16%. Vadodara has a sex ratio of 934 females for every 1000 males. It has a literacy rate of 81.21% in 2011, a ten percentage points increase in 10 years.

The divided district has a population of 3,093,795, of which 1,993,356 (64.43%) lived in urban areas. The divided district had a sex ratio of 923 females per 1000 males. Scheduled Castes and Scheduled Tribes make up 196,350 (6.35%) and 293,039 (9.47%) of the population respectively.

Religion

Hindus were 2,678,856 (86.59%), while Muslims were 350,357 (11.32%), Jains 26,355 (1.32%) and Christians 23,229 (0.75%).

Language

At the time of the 2011 census, 81.97% of the population spoke Gujarati, 9.64% Hindi, 4.51% Marathi and 1.11% Sindhi as their first language.

Politics
  

|}

Ecology
The Wadhvana Wetland located here is a wetland that was designated as a Ramsar wetland site on 2021.

Notable personalities
 Premanand Bhatt (1649–1714) Author. Born in Vadodara.
 Nayan Mongia- Cricketer
 Jacob Martin- Cricketer
 Irfan Pathan- Cricketer
 Yusuf Pathan- Cricketer
 Hardik Pandya - Cricketer
 Krunal Pandya - Cricketer
 Kiran More - Cricketer 
 Anshul Trivedi- Actor
 Dharmesh Yelande - Choreographer and Actor
 Deepak Hooda - Cricketer
 Bhuvan Bam - Youtuber
 Vijay Hazare - Cricketer
 Anshuman Gaekwad - Cricketer

References

External links

 Official website
Vadodara Collectorate
Vadodara Municipal Corporation
Vadodara lok sabha by election 2014

 
Districts of Gujarat